Wu Hsin-hsing is a politician of Taiwan, serving as Minister of the Overseas Community Affairs Council, Republic of China (ROC) since 20 May 2016 until 19 May 2020.

Early life
Wu obtained his bachelor's degree in English literature from Soochow University in 1982, master's degree in international relations from New Mexico State University in the United States in 1984 and doctoral degree in political science from University of Melbourne in Australia in 1989.

See also
 Overseas Chinese

References

Living people
Government ministers of Taiwan
Representatives of Taiwan
Soochow University (Taiwan) alumni
Year of birth missing (living people)